Zinc perchlorate is the inorganic compound with the chemical formula .

Synthesis
Zinc perchlorate can be prepared by dissolving zinc oxide or zinc carbonate in perchloric acid:

ZnO + 2HClO4 -> Zn(ClO4)2 + H2O

ZnCO3 + 2HClO4 -> Zn(ClO4)2 + H2O + CO2

Chemical properties
The compound  decomposes when heated to high temperatures and may explode if heated too strongly.

Like most other perchlorates such as copper perchlorate and lead perchlorate, zinc perchlorate is prone to deliquescence.

Zinc perchlorate can form complexes with ligands such as 8-aminoquinoline, tricarbohydrazide, and tetraphenylethylene tetratriazole.

Physical properties
The compound forms a hexahydrate ·6.

Zinc perchlorate forms a hygroscopic colorless solid, odorless, soluble in water and low-weight alcohols.

Uses
Zinc perchlorate is used as an oxidizing agent and catalyst.

References

External links

Perchlorates
Oxidizing agents
Zinc compounds